A hag is a wizened old woman, or a kind of fairy or goddess having the appearance of such a woman, often found in folklore and children's tales such as "Hansel and Gretel".

Etymology

As a stock character in fairy or folk tale, the hag shares characteristics with the crone, and the two words are sometimes used as if interchangeable.

Using the word hag to translate terms found in non-English (or non-modern English) is contentious, since use of the word is sometimes associated with misogyny.

In folklore
A hag, or "the Old Hag", was a nightmare spirit in English and anglophone North American folklore. This variety of hag is essentially identical to the Old English mæra—a being with roots in ancient Germanic superstition, and closely related to the Scandinavian mara. According to folklore, the Old Hag sat on a sleeper's chest and sent nightmares to him or her. When the subject awoke, he or she would be unable to breathe or even move for a short period of time. In the Swedish film Marianne (2011), the main character suffers from such nightmares. This state is now called sleep paralysis, but in the old belief, the subject was considered "hagridden". It is still frequently discussed as if it were a paranormal state.

Many stories about hags seem to have been used to frighten children into being good. In Northern England, for example, Peg Powler was a river hag who lived in the River Tees and had skin the colour of green pond scum. Parents who wanted to keep their children away from the river's edge told them that if they got too close to the water, she would pull them in with her long arms, drown them, and sometimes eat them.  This type of nixie or neck has other regional names, such as Grindylow (a name connected to Grendel), Jenny Greenteeth from Yorkshire, and Nelly Longarms from several English counties.

Many tales about hags do not describe them well enough to distinguish between an old woman who knows magic, or a witch or supernatural being.

In Slavic folklore, Baba Yaga was a hag who lived in the woods in a house on chickens legs. She would often ride through the forest on a mortar, sweeping away her tracks with a broom. Though she is usually a single being, in some folktales three Baba Yagas are depicted as helping the hero in his quest, either by giving advice or by giving gifts.

In Irish and Scottish mythology, the cailleach is a hag goddess concerned with creation, harvest, the weather, and sovereignty. In partnership with the goddess Bríd, she is a seasonal goddess, seen as ruling the winter months while Bríd rules the summer. In Scotland, a group of hags, known as The Cailleachan (The Storm Hags) are seen as personifications of the elemental powers of nature, especially in a destructive aspect. They are said to be particularly active in raising the windstorms of spring, during the period known as A Chailleach.

Hags as sovereignty figures abound in Irish mythology. The most common pattern is that the hag represents the barren land, who the hero of the tale must approach without fear, and come to love on her own terms. When the hero displays this courage, love, and acceptance of her hideous side, the sovereignty hag then reveals that she is also a young and beautiful goddess.

In ancient Greek religion, the Three Fates (particularly Atropos) are often depicted as hags. 

Hags are similar to Lilith of the Torah and the Old Testament.

In Western literature

In mediaeval and later literature, the term hag, and its relatives in European languages, came to stand for an unattractive, older woman. Building on the mediaeval tradition of such women as portrayed in comic and burlesque literature, specifically in the Italian Renaissance, the hag represented the opposite of the lovely lady familiar from the poetry of Petrarch.

The hag as a fantastic creature has also been used in some fantasy novels, such as the contemporary Harry Potter series by J.K. Rowling. Hags are depicted as a species of ugly, child-eating women with numerous warts.

In The Heroes or Greek Fairy Tales For My Children, Charles Kingsley characterized Scylla as "Scylla the sea hag".
The term Sea Hag was later popularized in the 20th-century United States as the name for a Popeye comic strip character.

In Prince Caspian by C. S. Lewis a hag tries to resurrect the White Witch.

See also
 
Baba Yaga
Banshee
Batibat
Black Annis
Boo hag
Cailleach
Crone
Freddy Krueger
Goblin
Hag (Dungeons & Dragons)
Imp
Kikimora
Muma Pădurii
Queen (Snow White)
Sea Hag
Sheela na Gig
The Witch (fairy tale)
Wicca
Wicked fairy godmother
Witch
Witchcraft

References

Further reading
Sagan, Carl (1997) The Demon-Haunted World: Science as a Candle in the Dark.
Kettlewell, N; Lipscomb, S; Evans, E. (1993) Differences in neuropsychological correlates between normals and those experiencing "Old Hag Attacks". Percept Mot Skills 1993 Jun;76 (3 Pt 1):839-45; discussion 846.

External links
Henry Fuseli's painting of a hag, from the Met collection

 
European legendary creatures
Fairies
Pejorative terms for women

Folklore characters
European folklore characters
Fairy tale stock characters
Gender-related stereotypes
Slang terms for women
Female legendary creatures

de:Hexe